Title 27 of the United States Code outlines the role of intoxicating liquors in the United States Code.

 —General Provisions
 —Prohibition of Intoxicating Beverages
 —Beer, Ale, Porter, and Similar Fermented Liquor
 —Industrial Alcohol
 —Penalties
 —Prohibition Reorganization Act of 1930
 —Transportation in Interstate Commerce
 —Liquor Law Repeal and Enforcement Act
 —Federal Alcohol Administration Act
 —Liquor Enforcement Act of 1936

External links
U.S. Code Title 27, via United States Government Printing Office
U.S. Code Title 27, via Cornell University

27
Alcohol law in the United States